The 2000–01 Princeton Tigers men's basketball team represented Princeton University in intercollegiate college basketball during the 2000–01 NCAA Division I men's basketball season. The head coach was John Thompson III and the team captain was Nate Walton. The team played its home games in the Jadwin Gymnasium on the University campus in Princeton, New Jersey, and was the champion of the Ivy League, which earned them an invitation to the 64-team 2001 NCAA Division I men's basketball tournament where they were seeded fifteenth in the South Region. Prior to the season on September 7, Thompson replaced Northwestern-bound Bill Carmody, who had achieved the Ivy League's highest career winning percentage, as head coach.  The team made the sixth of what would become seven consecutive postseason appearances.

Using the Princeton offense under first year coach Thompson, the team posted a 16–11 overall record and an 11–3 conference record.  The season marked the thirteenth consecutive time and 31st of 33 that either Penn or Princeton had won or shared the Ivy League regular season title. In its March 16, 2001 NCAA Division I men's basketball tournament South Regional first round game against the North Carolina Tar Heels at the Superdome New Orleans, Louisiana the team lost by a 70–48 margin.

The team was led by first team All-Ivy League selection Walton and Ivy League Men's Basketball Rookie of the Year Konrad Wysocki. C.J. Chapman made 50.0% of his three-point field goals in his conference games to earn the Ivy League statistical championship.

References

Princeton Tigers men's basketball seasons
Princeton Tigers
Princeton
Prince
Prince